The 1983 New York Cosmos season was the original Cosmos franchise's thirteenth season of existence, and their thirteenth in the original North American Soccer League. At the time, the NASL represented the top tier of American soccer. Finishing the season with 194 points off of 22 wins and eight losses, the Cosmos clinched their sixth-consecutive regular season championship, and their seventh overall. In the postseason, however, the Cosmos lost to Montreal Manic.

Roster 

 

Source:

Results 
Source:

Friendlies

Preseason

Regular season

Standings 

W = Wins, L = Losses, T= Ties GF = Goals For, GA = Goals Against, Pts= point system

6 points for a win
1 point for a shootout win
0 points for a loss
1 point for each regulation goal scored up to three per game

 Eastern Division

Overall

Source:

Matches

Postseason

Overview

Quarter-finals

Semi-finals

Soccer Bowl '83

Matches

See also 
 1983 North American Soccer League season
 List of New York Cosmos seasons

References 

New York Cosmos
New York Cosmos seasons
New York
New York Cosmos